

G 

 
 
 
 
 
 355 Gabriella
 
 
 
 
 
 1665 Gaby
 
 
 
 
 
 
 
 1184 Gaea
 
 
 
 
 1772 Gagarin
 
 
 
 
 
 
 
 
 
 
 
 
 
 
 
 14789 GAISH
 
 1835 Gajdariya
 
 
 
 
 
 
 
 
 
 
 1250 Galanthus
 
 74 Galatea
 
 
 
 427 Galene
 
 
 
 
 
 
 
 697 Galilea
 
 
 
 
 
 
 
 
 
 148 Gallia
 
 
 
 
 
 1992 Galvarino
 
 
 
 
 
 
 
 
 
 
 
 
 
 
 
 3330 Gantrisch
 1036 Ganymed
 
 
 
 
 
 
 
 
 
 
 
 
 
 
 
 
 
 
 
 
 
 
 
 
 
 
 
 
 
 
 
 
 
 
 
 
 
 
 180 Garumna
 
 
 
 
 
 
 
 
 
 
 
 
 
 
 
 
 
 
 951 Gaspra
 
 
 
 
 
 
 
 
 
 6478 Gault
 1001 Gaussia
 
 
 
 
 
 7369 Gavrilin
 
 2054 Gawain
 
 
 
 
 
 9298 Geake
 
 
 
 764 Gedania
 
 
 
 
 
 1267 Geertruida
 
 
 1272 Gefion
 
 
 1777 Gehrels
 
 
 
 
 
 2571 Geisei
 1047 Geisha
 
 
 1199 Geldonia
 
 
 1073 Gellivara
 
 
 
 
 
 
 
 
 
 
 
 
 
 1237 Geneviève
 
 2093 Genichesk
 
 
 
 
 680 Genoveva
 
 
 
 485 Genua
 
 
 
 
 
 
 
 
 1620 Geographos
 
 376 Geometria
 
 3854 George
 
 
 
 
 
 
 
 
 
 
 
 
 
 
 
 
 
 
 
 
 
 
 
 359 Georgia
 
 
 
 
 3700 Geowilliams
 
 300 Geraldina
 1433 Geramtina
 1227 Geranium
 1337 Gerarda
 
 
 
 
 
 2126 Gerasimovich
 
 
 
 
 122 Gerda
 
 
 
 
 
 
 
 
 
 
 
 
 
 
 663 Gerlinde
 241 Germania
 10208 Germanicus
 
 
 
 
 
 
 686 Gersuind
 
 1382 Gerti
 710 Gertrud
 
 
 
 
 
 
 
 
 
 1672 Gezelle
 
 
 
 
 
 
 
 
 
 
 
 
 
 
 
 
 
 
 
 
 
 
 
 
 
 
 
 
 
 
 
 
 
 
 2937 Gibbs
 
 
 1741 Giclas
 
 
 
 
 
 
 
 
 
 
 
 
 
 
 
 
 
 
 
 
 
 
 
 
 
 2537 Gilmore
 
 
 
 
 
 
 
 613 Ginevra
 5474 Gingasen
 
 2658 Gingerich
 
 
 
 
 
 
 
 
 
 
 
 5148 Giordano
 
 
 
 
 
 
 
 
 
 
 
 
 
 
 
 
 
 
 352 Gisela
 
 
 
 492 Gismonda
 
 
 
 
 
 
 
 
 
 
 
 
 
 
 7638 Gladman
 
 
 
 1687 Glarona
 857 Glasenappia
 
 
 
 
 
 
 288 Glauke
 1870 Glaukos
 
 
 
 
 
 
 
 
 
 
 
 
 
 
 
 
 
 1823 Gliese
 
 
 
 
 3267 Glo
 
 
 
 
 
 
 
 
 
 
 
 
 
 9965 GNU
 
 
 316 Goberta
 
 
 
 
 
 
 
 
 
 
 
 
 
 3047 Goethe
 1728 Goethe Link
 
 
 1722 Goffin
 
 
 
 
 
 
 
 
 
 
 
 
 
 
 
 
 
 
 
 
 
 
 
 
 6489 Golevka
 
 1226 Golia
 
 
 
 
 
 
 
 
 
 
 
 
 
 
 
 
 
 225088 Gonggong
 31179 Gongju
 
 
 
 1177 Gonnessia
 
 
 
 
 
 
 
 
 
 
 
 
 
 
 
 
 
 
 
 305 Gordonia
 8013 Gordonmoore
 
 
 
 
 
 
 
 
 
 681 Gorgo
 
 
 7675 Gorizia
 17198 Gorjup
 
 
 
 
 
 
 
 
 
 
 
 
 
 
 
 3640 Gostin
 10551 Göteborg
 
 1346 Gotha
 1710 Gothard
 1188 Gothlandia
 1049 Gotho
 
 
 
 
 
 
 
 
 
 
 2278 Götz
 
 
 
 
 
 
 
 
 
 
 
 
 
 
 
 
 
 
 
 
 
 
 
 3202 Graff
 
 9617 Grahamchapman
 
 
 
 
 
 
 
 
 
 
 1159 Granada
 
 
 
 
 
 1451 Granö
 
 
 
 
 
 
 
 
 
 
 1661 Granule
 
 
 
 
 424 Gratia
 
 
 9175 Graun
 
 
 
 
 
 
 
 
 
 
 
 
 
 
 
 
 
 
 
 
 2830 Greenwich
 
 
 
 
 
 
 
 
 
 
 
 
 
 
 
 
 
 
 
 
 
 
 
 
 
 
 984 Gretia
 
 
 
 
 
 
 
 
 4451 Grieve
 
 
 
 
 
 
 
 
 
 
 
 
 
 
 
 
 1362 Griqua
 493 Griseldis
 
 
 
 
 
 
 
 
 
 
 
 
 
 
 
 
 
 
 
 
 
 
 
 
 
 9994 Grotius
 
 
 
 
 
 1058 Grubba
 
 
 
 
 
 
 
 
 
 
 
 496 Gryphia
 
 
 
 
 
 
 
 
 
 
 
 
 
 
 
 
 
 
 
 
 
 328 Gudrun
 799 Gudula
 
 
 
 
 
 
 
 
 
 
 
 
 
 
 
 
 
 27270 Guidotti
 
 
 
 
 
 
 2483 Guinevere
 
 1960 Guisan
 
 
 
 
 
 
 
 
 
 
 
 
 
 
 
 891 Gunhild
 983 Gunila
 657 Gunlöd
 
 
 
 
 
 961 Gunnie
 1944 Günter
 
 
 
 
 
 
 
 2012 Guo Shou-Jing
 
 
 
 
 
 
 
 
 
 
 
 
 
 
 
 
 
 
 
 
 777 Gutemberga
 
 
 
 
 
 
 
 
 
 
 
 
 
 
 
 
 
 
 806 Gyldénia
 
 
 444 Gyptis
 
 
 229762 Gǃkúnǁʼhòmdímà

See also 
 List of minor planet discoverers
 List of observatory codes

References 
 

Lists of minor planets by name